The Laffite X-Road is an off-road sports car designed by the American automobile manufacturer Laffite Supercars. The company plans an initial production run of 30 cars, with a starting price of $465,000.

Presentation 
The Laffite X-Road is the fruit of the partnership of several companies. Laffite Supercars, founded by Bruno Laffite, the nephew of racing driver Jacques Laffite, is responsible for the creation of the vehicle. "G-TEC", a company led by engineer Philippe Gautheron, created the entire chassis and running gear. Anthony Jannarelly, founder of Jannarelly Automotive and designer of Lykan HyperSport, took care of the exterior design. Team Virage Group tested and refined the settings of the concept.

The origin of the project dates back to 2015 with the presentation of the buggy Zarooq SandRacer 500GT, which was to be produced in 2017. While that project was abandoned, Bruno Laffite, former director of operations for Zarooq Motors, relaunched the project with the help of Anthony Jannarelly, who designed the SandRacer 500GT.

Technical characteristics 
The luxury buggy rests on a tubular chassis in chromium-molybdenum steel and is 4.29 meters long and 2.14 meters wide for a mass of 1.3 tons. The interior of the cabin is lined with leather and touches of carbon fiber and aluminum. The X-Road has 17 inch rims fitted with BF Goodrich tires, and its suspensions accept a 450 mm travel. 

The engine is mated to a five-speed or six-speed sequential gearbox with paddles on the steering wheel, all distributing power to the rear wheels.

The X-Road offers the possibility of choosing a  electric motor powered by a 60 kWh lithium-ion battery, with a range of 322 km. The weight of the electric version is 1.63 tons. This version will cost $545,000.

References

External links 
 Official Site

Electric sports cars
First car made by manufacturer
2020s cars
Cars introduced in 2020